The term South German Jurassic in earth history is used to refer to a lithostratigraphic rock unit at the hierarchical level of a super group. The rocks of the South German Jurassic were mainly deposited during the Jurassic period (199 to 146 million years ago). The boundaries of the South German Jurassic and those of the chronostratigraphic or international Jurassic are not, however, exactly coincident. The depositions began rather later than the date of the international Triassic/Jurassic boundary and end as a result of erosion of the uppermost strata at various times during the Upper Jurassic, i.e. well before the international Jurassic/Cretaceous boundary. The rock unit of the South German Jurassic is underlain by Keuper; in between is a small stratigraphic hiatus. Above the South German Jurassic the beds follow discordantly and with a large stratigraphic gap; in addition, Regensburg Green Sandstone occurs very locally, which is dated to the Cenomanian stage of the Cretaceous period. In its southern fringes the South German Jurassic dives under the Palaeogene molasse depositions of the basement.

Divisions 
The main divisions of the South German Jurassic are the:

 Black Jurassic - 199 to 175 million years ago
 Brown Jurassic - 175 to 161 million years ago
 White Jurassic -161 to 150 million years ago

References

Literature 
 Leopold von Buch: Über den Jura in Deutschland. Abhandlungen der königlichen Akademie der Wissenschaften zu Berlin, 1837: 49-135, Berlin, 1839 online
Eckhard Mönnig: Der Jura in Norddeutschland in der STD 2002. Newsletters on Stratigraphy, 41(1-3): 253–261, Stuttgart, 2005 
 Albert Oppel: Die Juraformation Englands, Frankreichs und des südwestlichen Deutschlands. Württembergische naturwissenschaftliche Jahreshefte, 12-14: 857 pp., Stuttgart, 1856-58 
 Friedrich August Quenstedt: Das Flözgebirge Würtembergs. Mit besonderer Rücksicht auf den Jura. Verlag der Laupp'schen Buchhandlung, Tübingen, 1843.
 Friedrich August Quenstedt: Der Jura. Verlag der Laupp'schen Buchhandlung, Tübingen, 1856–57.

External links 
 (pdf; 300 kB)
Deutsche Stratigraphische Kommission (publ.): Stratigraphische Tabelle von Deutschland 2002. Potsdam, 2002,  – pdf; 6.57 MB (large)
Geologische Übersicht der Schichtenfolge in Baden-Württemberg (pdf; 183 kB)

 
Geologic formations of Germany
Jurassic System of Europe
Jurassic Germany